Hugo Moreira may refer to:
Hugo Moreira (footballer, born 1982), Portuguese footballer
Hugo Moreira (footballer, born 1990), Portuguese footballer